Air Commodore-in-Chief is a senior honorary air force appointment which originated in the Royal Air Force and now exists in the air forces of various Commonwealth realms. Appointees are made Air Commodore-in-Chief of a large air force organisation or formation.  Initially only the British monarch held air commodore-in-chief appointments. However, since the second half of the 20th century, other members of the royal family have been appointed to such positions in the United Kingdom and the other realms such as Australia, Canada and New Zealand. , these appointments have been given to just six senior members of the royal family, of whom four were reigning or future monarchs of the Commonwealth realms.

Air commodore-in-chief appointments do not confer a rank, be it air commodore or otherwise. Air commodore-in-chief appointments are more senior than honorary air commodore appointments.  The equivalent naval title of Commodore-in-Chief was introduced in 2006.

Air commodores-in-chief

Prince Edward, Prince of Wales
Prince Edward, Prince of Wales (later King Edward VIII and then Duke of Windsor), held the following appointments:
 United Kingdom
  1932 –1936 : Air Commodore-in-Chief of the Auxiliary Air Force

King George VI

King George VI held the following appointments:
 United Kingdom
  1936  – 1952: Air Commodore-in-Chief of the Auxiliary Air Force (The Royal Auxiliary Air Force from 1947)
  1941  – 1952: Air Commodore-in-Chief of the Air Training Corps
  1947  – 1952: Air Commodore-in-Chief of the Royal Air Force Regiment
  1950  – 1952: Air Commodore-in-Chief of the Royal Observer Corps

Queen Elizabeth II

Queen Elizabeth II held the following appointments:
 Australia
  1954  – 2022 : Air Commodore-in-Chief of the Australian Citizen Air Force

 Canada
  1953  – 1968: Air Commodore-in-Chief of the Royal Canadian Air Force Auxiliary

 New Zealand
  1953  – 2022: Air Commodore-in-Chief of the Territorial Air Force of New Zealand

 United Kingdom
  1953  – 2022: Air Commodore-in-Chief of the Royal Auxiliary Air Force
  1953  – 2022: Air Commodore-in-Chief of the Royal Air Force Regiment
  1953  – 1996: Air Commodore-in-Chief of the Royal Observer Corps

Prince Philip

Prince Philip, Duke of Edinburgh, held the following appointments:

 /  Canada
  /  1953 – 2021: Air Commodore-in-Chief of the Royal Canadian Air Cadets

 United Kingdom
  1953 – 2015: Air Commodore-in-Chief of the Air Training Corps

King Charles III

King Charles III, held the following appointments:

 United Kingdom
  2022 –present: Air Commodore-in-Chief of the Royal Air Force

 New Zealand
  1977 –2015: Air Commodore-in-Chief of the Royal New Zealand Air Force

References

Military ranks of the Royal Air Force
Honorary military appointments
British monarchy
Monarchy in Canada
Monarchy in Australia
Monarchy in New Zealand